The Strangers is a 2012 Philippine horror adventure film directed by Lawrence Fajardo and one of the official entries of the 38th Metro Manila Film Festival. The film stars an ensemble cast including Enchong Dee, Julia Montes, Enrique Gil and JM De Guzman with Janice de Belen. The film is produced by Quantum Films and MJM Productions and distributed by Star Cinema on December 25, 2012.

Plot
The story takes place on a family who got lost in a province and start being hunted by The Strangers especially the killer
.

For their 18th birthday, twins Pat and Max (Julia Montes and Enrique Gil) go on their annual out of town family trip, to the far flung oasis of Murcia. Joining them are their parents Roy and Evelyn (Johnny Revilla and Cherry Pie Picache), their grandfather Pete (Jaime Fabregas), his temporary caregiver Paloma (Janice de Belen) and their newly hired family driver, Toning (Nico Antonio). The family members set aside personal differences and go on with the trip, as they look forward to the provincial excursion.

Treading the rough roads of the countryside, their happiness is cut short when their van hits an old lady on the road. Unsure of what happened, the family tries to search for the body but it is nowhere to be found.

With the body missing, and protesting their innocence, Roy quickly asks everyone to go aboard the van and leave the vicinity. The van silently trudges its way along the dusty road but mysteriously stops after a few minutes in the middle of a forested area in Cabitongan. And from then on, as night sets in, the family is hounded by bad luck. Toning is attacked by an unknown creature, Roy goes missing, Lolo Pete becomes impaled by a trap when cornered by a monstrous creature while the rest of the family members are stranded in the middle of nowhere.

Lost and confused, the remaining family members unite but things take a turn for the worst, when they realize that they are trapped in a barrio full of mysterious people headed by Kapitan Tasyo (Art Acuña), his wife Corazon (Tanya Gomez) and their son Crispin (JM de Guzman). Evelyn meets a woman who warns them they're with demons but Corazon dismisses her, telling Paloma and Evelyn that the woman is Tasio's mother and has gone insane. Pat continues to suffer from stomach pains and they see a local albularyo. The men out hunting for Roy and Lolo Pete find a man who warned about a fierce monster attacking his companion.

As they are stuck in the isolated village, a series of aswang attacks begin. Pat finds alliance and connection in the unlikely form of Dolfo (Enchong Dee), an enigmatic young man, but whom the villagers suspect to be evil. Pat follows Dolfo in his cave and helps clean up his wounds. Dolfo tells of his past and how the aswang killed his whole family. The men out searching meets Lolo Pete's cadaver and finds it unusual. They realize they're looking at the remains of the aswang.

Pat, Max and their parents are revealed to actually secretly be a clan of aswangs (along with Lolo Pete who was killed in a struggle for dominance with Roy) and transform into their monstrous forms. Max kills some men who joined the search while Evelyn kills Corazon while Paloma escapes. Pat attacks Dolfo but in the end kills him. Max succeeds in killing Tasio, in revenge for killing Roy. A year later, the twins are going on another annual trip to the province, this time with their uncle, Roy's brother.

Cast

Enchong Dee as Dolfo
Enrique Gil as Max
Julia Montes as Pat
Cherry Pie Picache as Evelyn
Art Acuña as Kapitan Tasyo
Nico Antonio as Toning
Janice de Belen as Paloma
Jaime Fabregas as Lolo Pete
Mark Gil† (Uncredited)
Tanya Gomez as Corazon
JM De Guzman as Crispin
Rita De Guzman as Celia
Spanky Manikan† as the albularyo
Johnny Revilla as Roy

Casting
After the film was submitted as an official entry to the 38th Metro Manila Film Festival, It was announced that Quantum Films cast Star Magic contract artists including Enchong Dee, Julia Montes and Enrique Gil for the lead roles. Other cast announced includes Janice De Belen, Cherie Pie Picache and Jaime Fabregas.

In October 2012, after the official teaser were released, JM De Guzman and Johnny Revilla were added to the cast.

Reception

Critical reception
The film was graded "B" by the Cinema Evaluation Board.

Box office
The film opened at fifth spot out of the eight entries in the 2012 Metro Manila Film Festival, grossing with over ₱4.9 million and is behind Sisterakas (₱39.2 million), Si Agimat, si Enteng Kabisote at si Ako (₱29.4 million), One More Try (₱13.2 million) and Shake, Rattle & Roll 14: The Invasion (₱10.6 million), which opened first until fourth places.

References

External links
 

2012 films
Philippine horror films
2012 horror films
Philippine teen films
Star Cinema films